Burun Daraq (also Romanized as Būrūn Daraq; also known as Bīrūn Daraq, Borūn Daraq, Burun-Dara, and Būrūn Darreh) is a village in Sina Rural District, in the Central District of Varzaqan County, East Azerbaijan Province, Iran. At the 2006 census, its population was 47, in 7 families.

References 

Towns and villages in Varzaqan County